Bet.co.za is a South African sports betting and entertainment company founded 2010. Bet.co.za offers online betting odds on soccer/football, horse racing, rugby, cricket, tennis, and other sports.
Other types of games are offered, including Bet Vegas, Bet Games, Bet Spins (slots), and Lucky Numbers betting. Bet.co.za also operates Bet Central, a publisher of sports news and betting tips. 

Bet.co.za is licensed and regulated by the Western Cape Gambling & Racing Board in South Africa.

History 
Bet.co.za was founded in 2010 after South Africa hosted the 2010 FIFA World Cup. Headquarters located in Cape Town, NA – South Africa, South Africa.

In 2017, Bet.co.za attracted attention with betting markets for the ANC presidential race, with Cyril Ramaphosa being the favourite.

In 2018, Bet.co.za announced a partnership with former Kaizer Chiefs, Orlando Pirates and Bafana Bafana soccer player Jimmy Tau.

Tsogo Sun Gaming, a division of Tsogo Sun, acquired a majority ownership of Bet.co.za in 2020.

Ownership 
Betcoza Online (RF) (Pty) Ltd, trading as Bet.co.za, is majority owned by Tsogo Sun Gaming, a division of Tsogo Sun. Tsogo Sun Gaming trades under the ticker symbol TSG on the Johannesburg Stock Exchange.

Regulation 
Bet.co.za is licensed and regulated by the Western Cape Gambling & Racing Board. Registration Number: 2010/005430/07

References

External links 

 Bet.co.za Official Site
 Tsogo Sun Gaming Official Site
 Tsogo Sun Financials

2010 establishments in South Africa
Companies based in Cape Town
South African brands